The 2021–22 Midlands Football League was the inaugural season of the Midlands Football League, the sixth tier of the Scottish football pyramid system. The season began with nine games on 17 July 2021.

Carnoustie Panmure became the inaugural league champions, winning their last seventeen games of the season to overhaul East Craigie and ultimately win the league by five points.

Teams

All 17 teams from the 2020–21 East Premiership North joined the league, along with Dundee St James (formerly Fintry AFC) from the Midlands Amateur Football Association and Letham from the Perthshire Amateur Football Association.

Stadia and locations

League table

Results
Each team will play each other twice, for a total of 36 fixtures.

References

External links

6
SCO
Midlands Football League seasons